Dream.8: Welter Weight Grand Prix 2009 First Round was a mixed martial arts event promoted by Fighting and Entertainment Group's mixed martial arts promotion Dream on April 5, 2009.  Unlike Dream's past tournaments, the Welter Weight Grand Prix is only scheduled to have eight participants.  DREAM's welterweight division has a  weight limit.

Results

See also
 Dream (mixed martial arts)
 List of Dream champions
 2009 in DREAM

Notes
Nick Diaz was among the early rumored participants in Dream's Welterweight Grand Prix. However, his participation in April's Strikeforce event seems to have excluded him from Dream.8.
Seichi Ikemoto defeated Hidetaka Monma at Deep 40 to qualify for the Welterweight Grand Prix.
Yuya Shirai defeated Yoon Young Kim at clubDEEP Tokyo: Protect Cup Final to qualify for the Welterweight Grand Prix.
One of the first announced bouts was a Middleweight fight between Andrews Nakahara and Zelg Galešić. However, after being admitted to a hospital in Croatia two weeks before DREAM.8, Zelg Galesic was not cleared to fight, and was replaced with Shungo Oyama.
Another scrapped match was a Middleweight bout between debuting Murilo Rua and Dong Sik Yoon. Two days before DREAM.8 Dong Sik Yoon was pulled from the card due to an unknown injury. He was replaced a day before the event by Riki Fukuda. Fukuda couldn't make the Middleweight limit on such a short notice so the match was held at catchweight of 89kg.

References

Dream (mixed martial arts) events
2009 in mixed martial arts
Sport in Nagoya
Mixed martial arts in Japan
2009 in Japan